Urgell may refer to:

People 
Modest Urgell, Spanish painter

Places in Lleida Province, Catalonia, Spain

Comarcas
Urgell
Alt Urgell
Pla d'Urgell

Municipalities
Bellcaire d'Urgell, La Noguera
Bell-lloc d'Urgell, Pla d'Urgell
Bellmunt d'Urgell, Noguera
Ivars d'Urgell, Pla d'Urgell
La Seu d'Urgell, 	Alt Urgell

Other places
County of Urgell, a historic Catalan county

Other uses 
Urgell Beatus, a 10th-century illuminated manuscript
Urgell (Barcelona Metro), a station in the Barcelona Metro network

See also 
Urgel (disambiguation)
Urgellet, a historical territory and a natural region of Catalonia